Hidden Treasures Ruslan FM 95.2 Miss Nepal 2018,  the 23rd annual Miss Nepal beauty pageant, was held on 11 April 2018 at Hotel Annapurna in Kathmandu, the capital city of Nepal.  On the coronation Night, the representative for 4 major pageants were crowned as  Miss Universe Nepal 2018,  Miss World Nepal 2018,  Miss Earth Nepal 2018 and  Miss International Nepal 2018..The representative for Miss Supranational was also selected from finalist from the Miss Nepal pageant.

At the event, Nagma Shrestha crowned her successor Manita Devkota as Miss Universe Nepal 2018 for the first time in Miss Nepal , Nikita Chandak crowned her successor Shrinkhala Khatiwada as Miss World Nepal 2018.Rojina Shrestha Crowned her successor Miss Earth Nepal 2018 and Niti Shah crowned her successor as  Miss International Nepal 2018. For the first time no Runner ups were announced .

In addition, the winners were received Rs 100,000 as prize for winning the title. The auditions of Miss Nepal were held from February 4-17 in Birtamode, Birgunj, Butwal, Chitwan, Dhangadhi, Dharan, Nepalgunj, Pokhara and Kathmandu.

NTV and NTV PLUS broadcast the pageant live and for the Nepalese abroad.

Results

Color keys

(●): The candidate is the winner of Miss Popular Choice (online voting) and got direct entry into Top 15 semi-Finalists.

Sub-titles

Contestants

Previous Experience
 (#1) Mahima Singh was Top 8 in Face of House of Fashion Season 1.
 (#2) Ronali Amatya is the winner of Model Hunt Nepal 2016 and Miss Eco International Nepal 2017.
 (#3) Kaysha Adhikari was Miss Angel 2010 2nd Runner Up.
 (#4) Anupama Bastola works as a RJ in her hometown, Biratnagar.
 (#7) Susmita Sapkota made it in Nepal Idol Season 1 Quarter Finalists.
 (#9) Shikshya Sangroula is winner of Little Queen Nepal 2007 winner and Face of Liril Season 2.
 (#14) Suvekshya Shrestha is Miss Teen Nepal 2013 2nd runner up.
 (#17) Mamta Joshi is Miss Pokhara 2017 which gave her a direct entry to Miss Nepal 2018 Top 25.
 (#20) Megha Shrestha is winner of Miss University Osaka 2016.
 (#21) Shristi Karki has acted in a movie called Gangster Blues.
 (#22) Aalisha Adhikari was Miss Mechi 2016 Top 5 Finalists.

References

External links
Miss Nepal Website
Miss Nepal Official Website
Miss Nepal Contestants

Beauty pageants in Nepal
2018 beauty pageants
Miss Nepal
2018 in Nepal